The equestrian statue of the Duke of Wellington is an outdoor sculpture of Arthur Wellesley, 1st Duke of Wellington, a British soldier and statesman, located at the Royal Exchange in London. It overlooks Bank junction in the historic City of London. The sculptor was Francis Leggatt Chantrey. The statue commemorates Wellington's assistance to the City of London in ensuring that a bill was passed to allow the rebuilding of London Bridge.

History
While sitting for a later portrait by Charles Robert Leslie, Wellington recalled that Chantrey had told him he had a square head. After Chantrey's sudden death his studio assistant Henry Weekes completed the sculpture.

Wellington attended the unveiling of his statue on 18 June 1844. The date was chosen to commemorate the Battle of Waterloo, where Wellington led an allied army to victory against Napoleon, in 1815. Frederick Augustus II, King of Saxony, who was in London visiting Queen Victoria, also attended the unveiling.

Description

The equestrian statue was erected to show the City's gratitude for Wellington's help in assisting the passage of the London Bridge Approaches Act 1827. This Act led to the creation of King William Street.

"Wellington" is inscribed on each side of the plinth; on its ends is the inscription "Erected June 18, 1844". A brass plaque at the plinth's base reads:

References

External links

 

1844 establishments in the United Kingdom
1844 sculptures
Bronze sculptures in the United Kingdom
Equestrian statues in the United Kingdom
Grade II listed buildings in the City of London
Grade II listed monuments and memorials
Military memorials in London
Monuments and memorials in London
Outdoor sculptures in London
Wellington, London
Statues in London
London, City